We The Fest is an annual summer festival of music, arts, fashion and food in Jakarta, Indonesia. The first edition was held on August 24, 2014, and it has since been held at Parkir Timur Senayan. In 2017, the event was moved to Jakarta International Expo Kemayoran. The event features many genres of music, including pop, rock, indie, hip hop and electronic dance music. It is promoted by Ismaya Live.

2014
The 2014 We The Fest took place on Sunday 24 August 2014 at Parkir Timur Senayan.

Line-up

Sponsors
Black Spot
Smirnoff Ice – official ready to drink
Johnnie Walker – official spirit
Samsung Galaxy K Zoom – official electronic brand
Nü Green Tea – official tea drink
Dr. Martens – official footwear
Guvera – official music partner
FOX – official TV partner
Yahoo! Indonesia – official online partner
The Sultan Hotel & Residence Jakarta – official hotel partner
Bobobobo – official online shop & travel
Monstore – official merchandise
Hypernet – official Internet provider
TSA

2015
The 2015 edition of We The Fest was held on Sunday 9 August 2015 at Parkir Timur Senayan.

Line-up

Sponsors
PT Gudang Garam
Nü Green Tea – official tea drink
The Sultan Hotel & Residence Jakarta – official hotel
GrabCar – official transport
Monstore – official merchandise
M Entertainment – official music channel

2016
The third edition was held on two days for the first time. It was held on Saturday 13 August and Sunday 14 August. The sixteen international acts and twenty-five local acts were set to perform in three stages. The WTF Stage was presented by Urban Gigs, while The Stage Is B.A.N.A.N.A.S!!! was presented by H&M, and The Another Stage was presented by Joox in collaboration with Indonesian independent music label, Demajors.

Submit Your Band
For the first time, Ismaya Live announced a competition called ‘Submit Your Band’ where the three chosen bands would have a chance to perform at the 2016 We The Fest. The three chosen bands were Hello Benji & The Cobra, Pijar and Westjam Nation. One of the finalists, Beeswax, also performed.

Line-up

Sponsors
 Urban Gigs
H&M – official international fashion brand
 Mizone – official isotonic drink
Smirnoff – official spirit
Joox – official music app
Samsung Galaxy A – official mobile phone
Nü Green Tea – official tea
Kit Kat – official break buddy
Ray-Ban – official eyewear
Fairmont Jakarta and The Sultan Hotel & Residence Jakarta – official hotel
Asia Pop 40 – official regional radio partner
Fox – official pay TV
Citilink – official airline

2017
Ismaya Live announced that the fourth edition of We The Fest would be held over three days. It was held on Friday 11 August, Saturday 12 August and Sunday 13 August at Jakarta International Expo Kemayoran, North Jakarta, Jakarta.

Submit Your Music
On May 8, Ismaya Live announced the return of Submit Your Band, but for this year, a solo artist could also participate.

Line-up

Sponsors
Urban Gigs
H&M – official international fashion brand
Vivo – official smartphone
Go-Jek – official on-demand app
Prost Beer – official beer
Kit Kat – official break buddy
Joox – official music app
Asia Pop 40 – official regional radio partner
Channel V – official music channel
Mizone – official isotonic drink
Grand Mercure – official hotel partner
Sosro Fruit Tea – official tea drink
bobobobo – official travel partner
Helpster – official staffing partner
Re.Working – official co-working partner

2018
The fifth edition of We the Fest was held on July 20–22, 2018.

Line-up

WTF Stage

Friday: Gamaliel Audrey Cantika, Maliq & D'Essentials, Albert Hammond Jr., Nick Murphy, James Bay, Alt-J

Saturday: Afgan Isyana Rendy, Efek Rumah Kaca, Barasuara, Honne, Lorde, Odesza

Sunday: White Shoes & The Couples Company, Padi Reborn, The Neighbourhood, Vince Staples, Miguel, SZA

The Stage Is Bananas

Friday: Mooner, Pijar, Polka Wars, Petra Sihombing, Ramengvrl , Moon Boots, Louis the Child, What So Not, Aydra 

Saturday: Mantra Vutura, Seringai, The Sam Willows, Andien, Eric Nam, Majid Jordan, Medasin, Party Favor, w.W 

Sunday: Teza Sumendra, Kimokal, Neonomora, Dipha Barus, SG Lewis, Petit Biscuit, Basenji

Another Stage

Friday: Garhana, Monkey to Millionaire, SoftAnimal, Neurotic, Nonaria, Laze, Patricia Schuldtz 

Saturday: Texpack, Garside, Semenjana, Bam Mastro, Matter Mos, A. Nayaka & The Blue Room Boys, Fun on a Weekend x Emotion All Stars, Diskoria

Sunday: Rayssa Dynta, Thearosa, Pee Wee Gaskins, Greybox & The Standstill Squad, Midnight Fusic, Abenk Alter, Bitzmika

2019
The 2019 edition was held on July 19–21. The first phase of the line-up was announced on February 23. The second phase was announced on April 10.

Line-up
WTF Stage

Friday: Fourtwnty, Dewa 19 ft. Ari Lasso & Dul Jaelani, Dean and Rad Museum, Capital Cities, Bazzi, Troye Sivan

Saturday: Eva Celia, Sabrina Claudio, Anne-Marie, Daniel Caesar, Travis

Sunday: Tulus, Dipha Barus, 6lack, Joji, Rae Sremmurd

The Stage Is Bananas

Friday: Glaskaca, Sore, The Adams, Alvvays, Cade, Jai Wolf, San Holo

Saturday: Dream Coterie, Barasuara, RAN, Jess Connelly, Baynk, Nina Las Vegas, Anna Lunoe

Sunday: .Feast, Elephant Kind, Warpaint, Cigarettes After Sex, Cashmere Cat, Yaeji

Another Stage

Friday: The Cat Police, Puti Chitara, Gerald Situmorang & Sri Hanuraga, Sal Priadi, Duara, Stan x w.W ft. Dave Slick

Saturday: Grrrl Gang, Nadin Amizah, Matter Halo, Endah N Rhesa, Pamungkas, Petra Sihombing ft. Enrico Octaviano, Fun on a Weekend ft. Soul Menace Crew

Sunday: Kelelawar Malam, Noirless, The Panturas, Kunto Aji, Dekat, Coldiac

WTF Park Stage

Friday: Amboro, Asteriska, Tuan Tigabelas

Saturday: Ify Alyssa, Hindia, Ardhito Pramono

Sunday: Kurosuke, Heidi, Tanayu

2020
The 2020 edition was scheduled to be held on 14-16 August 2020 at Jakarta International Expo, Kemayoran, North Jakarta, but cancelled due to the COVID-19 pandemic. The first phase of the line-up was announced on February 12, 2020. The festival was accolated to a livestreaming format, held on 26 and 27 September.

Virtual Home Edition Line-up

Lewis Capaldi
Masego
Oh Wonder
Autograf
Chilli.Dip (Dipha Barus × Vanessa Budihardja)
Goldroom
Isyana Sarasvati
Keshi
Maliq & D'Essentials
RAC
Vidi Aldiano
Yura Yunita
Diskoria
Endah & Rhesa
Gabber Modus Operandi
Hindia
Hondo
Jason Ranti
Kallula
Kunto Aji
LONE
Mantra Vutura with Elda Suryani, Natasha Udu and Agatha Pricilla
Moon Gang
Nadin Amizah
Pamungkas
Patricia Schuldtz
w.W

2022
The 2022 edition was held on 23–25 September 2022 at Gelora Bung Karno Sports Complex, Senayan, Kebayoran Baru, South Jakarta. The festival was headlined by Offset, Swae Lee, Jackson Wang and CL.

Line-ups

Offset
Swae Lee
Jackson Wang
CL
Afgan
Bag Raiders
Beabadoobee
Dewa 19 featuring Ello
Dipha Barus
Isyana Sarasvati
Jeremy Zucker
Laleilmanino
Lyodra
Maliq & D'Essentials
Oh Wonder
Pink Sweats
R3hab
Raisa
Shallou
Snakehips
Surf Mesa
Tulus
Vidi Aldiano
What So Not
Ali
Ardhito Pramono
Basboi
Bilal Indrajaya
Danilla
Gangga
Hindia
Hondo
Hursa
Idgitaf
Monkey to Millionaire
Nadin Amizah
Oslo Ibrahim
Pamungkas
Perunggu
Petra Sihombing
Rendy Pandugo
Scaller
Sore
Teddy Adhitya
The Adams
Zack Tabudlo

2023
The 2023 edition is set to be held on 21–23 July 2023.

Line-ups

The Strokes
The 1975
The Kid Laroi
Lewis Capaldi
Dermot Kennedy
dhruv
Gigi
Giveon
Gryffin (Live)
NxWorries (Anderson .Paak & Knxwledge)
Peach Tree Rascals
Porter Robinson (Live)
Project Pop
RINI
Sabrina Carpenter
Kunto Aji
Mikha Angelo
Rafi Sudirman
Rock N Roll Mafia
Syarikat Idola Remaja
Yura Yunita

References

Music festivals in Indonesia
Annual events in Indonesia
Music festivals established in 2014